Makaral Karthikeya Mudaliar (1857–1916) was an Indian scholar and  poet of Tamil ancestry from Veyttur, near Madurantakam in the state of Tamil Nadu.

Mudaliar authored Velir varalaatru maanbu, Aathichudi Muthar Viruthiyurai, Tamil Solvilakkam, and Mozhi nool.

References

Tamil poets
Tamil scholars
1857 births
1916 deaths
Indian male poets
19th-century Indian poets
20th-century Indian poets
Poets from Tamil Nadu
19th-century Indian male writers
20th-century Indian male writers